Glauert's anglerfish, Allenichthys glauerti, is an anglerfish that is in the monotypic genus, Allenichthys. It can grow to a length of  TL and can be found in deep waters around Southern Australia.

References
 

Antennariidae
Monotypic fish genera
Taxa named by Theodore Wells Pietsch III
Fish described in 1944